Preutești is a commune located in Suceava County, Romania. It is composed of six villages: Arghira, Basarabi, Bahna-Arin, Huși, Leucușești and Preutești. It also included Hiartop village until 2004, when it was split off to form a separate commune.

Natives
 Nicolae Beldiceanu

References

Communes in Suceava County
Localities in Western Moldavia